DZGR (891 AM) Bombo Radyo is a radio station owned and operated by Bombo Radyo Philippines through its licensee People's Broadcasting Service. Its studio, offices and transmitter are located at Bombo Radyo Broadcast Center, Taft St. Ext., Brgy. Centro 5, Tuguegarao City.

References

Radio stations in Cagayan
Bombo Radyo Philippines
News and talk radio stations in the Philippines
Radio stations established in 1996